Charlotte Arnold (born July 27, 1989) is a Canadian actress. She is best known for her roles as Sadie Hawthorne in Naturally, Sadie and Holly J. Sinclair in Degrassi: The Next Generation, for which she won a Gemini Award for Best Performance in a Children's or Youth Program or Series in 2010.

Early life 
Charlotte Arnold was born July 27, 1989 in Toronto. As of November 2008, Arnold was attending Ryerson University, majoring in broadcast journalism.

Career 
Her first acting role was Kate O'Neil in the made-for-TV movie Giant Mine. Then after a few minor roles, she had a role in the movie Custody of the Heart for which she was nominated for the 2001 Young Artist Award for Best Performance in a TV Movie (Comedy or Drama) for a Young Actress Age Ten or Under. In 2001, she lent her voice to the television series Committed. Over the next few years, she had roles in a few more made-for-TV movies, such as Harlan County War, One Kill, Range of Motion, and Jewel.

Arnold's career expanded in the mid-2000s. Beginning in 2005 , she starred for three seasons as the title character of the popular Family channel series Naturally, Sadie until 2007. From 2008 until 2013, she played Holly J. Sinclair on Degrassi. She attended high school with co-star Munro Chambers.

In 2010, she won a Gemini Award for Best Performance in a Children's or Youth Program or Series, in a season 9 episode of Degrassi.

Filmography

Awards and nominations
Young Artist Awards
2001 – Best Performance in a TV Movie (Comedy or Drama): Young Actress Age Ten or Under for Custody of the Heart (Nominated)

Gemini Awards
 2010 – Best Performance in a Children's or Youth Program or Series: Degrassi: The Next Generation (Won)

References

External links 

1989 births
20th-century Canadian actresses
21st-century Canadian actresses
Actresses from Toronto
Canadian child actresses
Canadian film actresses
Canadian television actresses
Canadian voice actresses
Living people